University of Nottingham Racing Team (UoNRT) is the University of Nottingham's student-run electric vehicle team. The team comprises two sub teams, namely Formula Student and Solar Challenge. The University of Nottingham also used to compete in the e-bike area, with its Power Electronics Machines and Control Research Group (PEMC) from the Faculty of Engineering. Working on new technologies they were awarded "best" EV at Formula Student UK 2021. The teams are currently developing a "Lighter, more efficient Formula Student car" and a 2-seater Solar Challenge car "designed around upcycled EV systems". The team relies on external sponsors to fund the development, manufacture and testing of the vehicle.

Together, the two sub teams are made up of approximately 80 undergraduates, postgraduates, and faculty staff.

Formula Student 

 UoNRT re-launched its Formula Student project in 2016, following a break of five years. The team designs a single-seat electric racing car to compete in the IMechE Formula Student UK competition against other teams with both electric and conventional combustion engine vehicles.

The team aimed to design and manufacture the UK’s first all-wheel drive electric car. The first entries in 2017, 2018 and 2019 did not participate in the competition’s dynamic events; the team placed 63rd, 61st and 59th respectively in these years. In 2020, UoNRT switched to a two-wheel drive powertrain and placed 19th out of 66 teams at the virtual static competition.  

UoNRT returned to Silverstone in 2021 with a new 2WD car and achieved their best results to date. The car placed third overall, and won "Best EV of 2021" On top of this, the UoNRT Business Team came first in their competition, beating 108 other universities. 

The 2021 car, named Frankie, will be used as a testing platform in 2021-22 as the team works on future projects including a new, lightweight drive unit and upgrading to a carbon fiber chassis and suspension.

FS2021

Specifications

Competitions

Sponsors 
The team relies on external sponsors to fund the development, manufacture and testing of the vehicle.

Current:

 ETPS Ltd
 KISSsoft
 Aerocom Metals
 Autosport Bearings & Components Ltd
 Bender
 Calspan (FSAE TTC)
 Charcroft Electronics
 Clarendon
 Cosworth
 GKN Automotive
 IPG Automotive
 Lubrizol
 Mathworks
 Macdonald Consultants
 Ohlins
 RLS
 KA Sensors
 Percepio
 Easy Composites
 Ansini
 Continental
 Contechs
 Scimitar
 JWA Racing
 Hel Performance
 University of Nottingham
Former:

 Anderson Power Products (APP)
 Kistler
 Raffenday EV
 Parker

Solar Challenge  

UoNRT started a new project in 2020-21 to build a solar-powered electric car to participate in Solar Challenge competitions around the world. The guiding principles of solar challenge vehicles are to be ultra-efficient, designed for endurance, and push the boundaries of sustainable electric vehicle technology.

This is the first time the University of Nottingham has set up a solar car project. The team are developing a Cruiser class car, and they are taking an approach focused on low-impact design and manufacture. Alongside featuring 5m2 of solar panels, UoNRT’s first solar car will be adapting and upcycling parts from used electric vehicles. The chassis is modified from a Renault Twizy base, and second-life Nissan Leaf batteries are installed. They aim to be an environmentally-friendly alternative to the growing problem of dealing with end-of-life batteries from electric vehicles.

The team aim to complete the first car in 2022, in time to participate in the European Solar Challenge and prepare for the World Solar Challenge in 2023. The team have said they will target further events around the world as the team develops.

SC2021

Specifications

Competitions

Sponsors 
The team relies on external sponsors to fund the development, manufacture and testing of the vehicle.

Current:

 EasyComposites
 Prohelion
 ETPS Ltd
 University of Nottingham

References 

Racing